Cerro Azul (Blue Hill) is a mountainous part of Panama Province. There is a well marked road leading to Cerro Azul from the 24 de Diciembre town of the Panama District of Panama City. The mountains reach an altitude of 950 meters (Cerro Jefe). Cerro Azul includes several villages including Rancho Cafe, Buena Vista, Las Vistas, Las Nubes and Los Altos. There is a lake on the main route to Cerro Azul where alligators have been spotted. The climate of Cerro Azul is pretty cool and it is a preferred weekend retreat for wealthy city dwellers wanting to escape the heat. Cerro Azul is an important poultry farming area, the Panamanian chicken and egg producer MELO has its production headquarters in Cerro Azul. Las Nubes and Los Altos de Cerro Azul have notable expatriate communities of mainly North American origin. Cerro Azul has gotten global media coverage after the "Cerro Azul monster" discovery.

Urbanization 

Los Altos de Cerro Azul is an urban project that is located 800 masl in the foothills of Cerro Jefe. It is approximately 40 minutes from Panama City. The climate of this area is 68 °F on average, with very few variations in the year. This project has paved streets, internet access, ecological trails, rivers, waterfalls, viewpoints. In addition, it has restaurants, swimming pools and a social area with tennis court, basketball and football.

References

Populated places in Panamá Province